The city of Montreal, Quebec, Canada held municipal elections on November 1, 1998, to elect a mayor and city councillors. Pierre Bourque was returned to a second term as mayor against a divided opposition.

Various suburban communities on the Island of Montreal also held elections on November 1.

Results

Mayor

Council
Party colours do not indicate affiliation or resemblance to any federal and provincial party.

Source: Election results, 1833-2005 (in French), City of Montreal.

Results in suburban communities (incomplete)

Dorval

Source: "West Island mayors returned," Montreal Gazette, November 2, 1998, A19.

Montreal North

Sources:

Saint-Leonard

References

1998 elections in Canada
Municipal elections in Montreal
1990s in Montreal
1998 in Quebec